This is a list of military parades held in Pyongyang, the capital of the Democratic People's Republic of Korea (DPRK) since 1948. All military parades consist of troops from the Korean People's Army and the paramilitary Worker-Peasant Red Guards. All military parades of a national nature are held on Pyongyang's Kim Il-sung Square with the General Secretary of the Workers' Party of Korea, President of the State Affairs Commission and Commander-in-Chief of the Armed Forces of North Korea in attendance. These parades are broadcast live on Korean Central Television.

Contrary to popular belief, military parades are for the most part, held on quintennial or decennial anniversaries (every 5 or 10 years) and/or jubilee years (ex: 25th anniversary, 40th anniversary, 50th anniversary, 60th anniversary, 70th anniversary).

Many parade participants are awarded with special decorative medals as well as certain arrangements at their barracks.

Military Foundation Day
Parades held in honor of Military Foundation Day:

1948
The first parade of Korean People's Army took place on Military Foundation Day in 1948. It took place at Pyongyang Station in the presence of Soviet generals from the 25th Army and Soviet Civil Administration. It included the participation of about 20,000 North Korean soldiers who stood at attention during the first part of the parade in which Premier Kim Il Sung presided as commander in chief.

1972
It celebrated the KPRA's ruby jubilee. Unlike the first parade, this parade included more diverse contingents of troops, particularly motorized infantry. According to a later defector from the Pyongyang Defense Command, a female officer collapsed after her appendix burst following the parade, to which she was "praised" by her superiors for having concealed it. Head of the Royal Government of the National Union of Kampuchea Prince Norodom Sihanouk, Marshal of the Soviet Union Kirill Moskalenko and commander of the Shenyang Military Region Chen Xilian were among the foreign dignitaries at the parade.

1992
In 1992, the KPRA's diamond jubilee parade was held. It saw the participation of over 20,000 active troops and 1,200 pieces of weaponry, as well veterans of all wars in which the DPRK was a participant. During the parade, KPA Supreme Commander Kim Jong-il made his first public speech during a military parade for the KPA's 60th anniversary and said: "Glory to the officers and soldiers of the heroic Korean People's Army!", which was followed by a loud applause by the crowd on the square. It was the last parade to include the Soviet-style goose step. Newly promoted Marshal O Jin-u made the keynote address and the parade was commanded by also newly promoted Vice Marshal Kim Kwang-jin.

2007
The parade celebrated the 75th anniversary of the KPRA. General Kim Kyok-sik, the then defence chief of the DPRK, gave the keynote address. The broadcast was delayed by three hours, with speculation by experts that this was due to Kim Jong Il's absence.

2013
The parade celebrated the 81st anniversary of the KPRA. It was one of the only times a parade was held on a non-jubilee year; the parade that was planned for the previous year was cancelled due to the preparations for the parade on the 100th anniversary of Kim Il Sung that was held ten days prior to the planned parade. It was the first to be held on the forecourt of the Kumsusan Palace of the Sun. Military hardware was not displayed during the parade. Speeches were delivered by commanders of the different branches of the KPA, during which they spoke of the military readiness of their branches.

2018
In 2018, the platinum jubilee anniversary of the founding of the KPA in its current form took place on 8 February that year. It was speculated that this parade, which was the first since the holiday was changed back to 8 February, was held deliberately to coincide with the 2018 Winter Olympics opening ceremony in Pyeongchang County, South Korea, during which North Korean and South Korean athletes marched together in the parade of nations. The parade included 13,000 soldiers of the KPA.

2022
It marked a memorable first appearance for agents and employees of the Ministry of State Security and the women's traffic police officers of the Korean People's Internal Security Forces.

For the first time, corps and force battalions had their division and regimental/wing colours carried on parade.

The columns of the troops are as follows:
Honor Guards, Historical Troops and Corps-level Units
Honorary cavalrymen 
Soldiers in  uniform
Soldiers in Fatherland Liberation War period uniform consisting the Army, Navy and Air Force
Guard Office of the Party Central Committee
Guard Department of the State Affairs Commission
Guard Department of the Party Central Committee
Supreme Guard Command
First Corps
Second Corps
Forth Corps
Fifth Corps
Navy
Air Force
Missile Maintenance Crewmembers of the Strategic Force
Special Operation Force
Anti-aircraft Artillery Corps
91st Corps
3rd Corps
7th Corps
8th Corps
9th Corps
10th Corps
12th Corps
Seoul Ryu Kyong Su 105th Guards Armored Division
Guards 123th Tank Division
425th Mechanized Infantry Division
108th Mechanized Infantry Division
815th Mechanized Infantry Division
806th Mechanized Infantry Division
Scouts Infantry
Mountain Infantry
Engineer Unit
Chemical Warfare Unit
Electronic Jammer Operations Unit

Universities and Military Schools of all levels
Kim Il Sung Military University
Kim Jong Il Military-Political University
Kim Il Sung University of Politics
Kim Jong Un University of National Defence
Kim Jong Suk Naval University
Kim Chaek Air Force University
Kang Kon Military Academy
O Jin U Artillery Academy
Mangyongdae Revolutionary School
Nampo Revolutionary School and Kang Pan Sok Revolutionary School

Worker-Peasant Red Guards, Ministry of State Security and Civil Defence
Worker-Peasant Red Guards
Ministry of State Security
Traffic Security Women of the Ministry of Social Security
Emergency Epidemic Prevention Workers
Tracker Dog Search Party of the Ministry of Social Security
Special Mobile Corps of the Ministry of Social Security

2023
The parade celebrated the 75th anniversary of the KPA. Supreme Leader Kim Jong-un, who presided over the celebration parade, did not make an address. It would be the first time a new ceremonial colour of the KPA would be presented in public, as well as the brand new colour designs for its service branches and component units. A bigger historical column formed part of the year's festivities, including a small mobile column of equipment used in the late 1940s. As the parade was held in February, which is winter in the country, all of the troops wore winter gear.

The columns of the troops are as follows:
Honor Guards, Historical Troops and Corps-level Units
Honorary cavalrymen
7th Regiment in the Anti-Japanese War Period
Bodyguard Company of the Supreme Headquarters during the Fatherland Liberation War
1st National Defence Division during the Fatherland Liberation War
2nd Lightly-armed Infantry Division during the Fatherland Liberation War
3rd Independent Infantry Brigade during the Fatherland Liberation War
4th Infantry Division during the Fatherland Liberation War
Guard Office of the Party Central Committee
Guard Department of the State Affairs Commission
Bodyguard Department
Bodyguard Command
1st Corps
2nd Corps
4th Corps
5th Corps
Navy
Air Force
Strategic Force
Special Operation Force
91st Corps
Anti-aircraft Artillery Corps
3rd Corps
7th Corps
8th Corps
9th Corps
10th Corps
12th Corps
Tank Armour Division
Seoul Ryu Kyong Su 105th Guards Armored Division
425th Mechanized Infantry Division
108th Mechanized Infantry Division
815th Mechanized Infantry Division
806th Mechanized Infantry Division
Reconnaissance General Bureau
191 Command Intelligence Brigade
21st Engineer Brigade
22nd Nuclearization Battalion
208th Electronic Jammer Operations Unit
1st Mobile Hospital

Universities and Military Schools of all levels
Kim Il Sung Military University
Kim Jong Il University of Military and Politics
Kim Il Sung University of Politics
Kim Jong Suk Naval University
Kim Chaek Air Force University
Kang Kon Military Academy
O Jin U Artillery Academy
Revolutionary Schools

Republic Day
Parades in honor of the Day of the Foundation of the Republic:

1988
The parade celebrated the 40th anniversary of the republic. A Polish film named Defilada (The Parade) was published in 1989 by Andrzej Fidyk, who was sent by the government of the Polish People's Republic to create a documentary on the parade as well as the larger 40th anniversary celebrations. Chinese President Yang Shangkun as well as Bulgarian Premier Georgi Atanasov were in attendance.

1998
It celebrated the golden jubilee of the DPRK's establishment. The massed bands included a tri-service element which included military bands from all the branches.

2003
It celebrated the 55th anniversary of independence. It was the largest parade seen in the country in over a decade. Contrary to what was speculated, the hour and a half parade did not feature any new missiles. Only medium range missiles were displayed in the hardware section. The parade was the last appearance of Pak Song-chol, Premier of North Korea from 1976 to 1977.

2008
It celebrated the diamond jubilee of the foundation of the republic. It was noted for the absence of General Secretary Kim Jong-Il, which caused speculation on his state of health. Many intelligence agencies in the United States believed Kim might be "gravely ill" after suffering from a stroke, which caused his absence from the parade. Only the Worker-Peasant Red Guards took part, providing personnel and equipment for the marchpast and the mobile column.

2011
It celebrated the 63rd anniversary of independence. It marked one of the last appearances by Kim Jong Il and his successor Kim Jong Un together. The parade followed the former's return from a state visit to Russia. Just like in 2008, the Worker-Peasant Red Guards made up the majority of the parading units.

2013 
The parade marked the 65th anniversary of the establishment of the republic.

2018
In 2018, North Korea marked the 70th anniversary of its foundation. The parade was inspected by Vice Marshal Ri Yong-gil and saw the introduction of new camouflage inspection vehicles. It also saw the rare refrain from displaying intercontinental ballistic missiles. Russian Federation Council Chairman Valentina Matviyenko and Mauritanian President Mohamed Ould Abdel Aziz, as well as delegations from Cuba, Syria, Lebanon, the State of Palestine, Uganda, and South Africa were in attendance during the celebrations. General Secretary of the Chinese Communist Party Xi Jinping was expected to attend the parade during his state visit to North Korea on 9 September, but cancelled his attendance, instead sending Li Zhanshu, the Chairman of the Standing Committee of the National People's Congress. American President Donald Trump displayed the parade as an accomplishment in the Korean peace process, noting the lack of ICBMs that were paraded.

2021 
In 2021, a civilian, internal and paramilitary forces parade took place on the midnight leading up to 9 September. This parade did not feature the Korean People's Army Ground Force and no associated heavy weaponry; it instead featured the Worker-Peasant Red Guards of various provinces and the Ministry of Public Security. Other units featured were the firefighters of Pyongyang, Air Koryo, Ministry of Railways, Kim Chaek Iron and Steel Complex, Huichon Ryonha Machine Factory, Hungnam Fertilizer Complex, Rakwon General Machine Enterprise, Chollima Steel Complex, Ryongsong Machine Complex, Sunchon Area Youth Coal Mining Complex, Pyongyang Kim Jong Suk Textile Mill, Ministry of Public Health, State Academy of Sciences, people involved in culture, Kim Il Sung University, Kim Chaek University of Technology and the Young Red Guards. Parachutists carrying the national flag landed in Kim Il-sung Square and various aircraft overflew the square, shooting flares. The WPK PAD Director Ri Il-hwan made a speech at the parade.

Workers Party Day
Parades in honor of Party Foundation Day:

1995

Celebrated the 50th golden jubilee anniversary of the WPK. The parade was the first of its kind held in the country. It was the first parade presided by Kim Jong Il as leader of the country. Defence minister Choe Kwang delivered the keynote address at the ceremony.

2000
Celebrated the 55th anniversary of the WPK.

2005
It celebrated the 60th anniversary of the WPK.

2010
Celebrated the 65th anniversary of the WPK. It was the first time Kim Jong Il's successor Kim Jong Un had appeared at a military parade. This appearance came two weeks after Kim was made Kim Jong-un was made a daejang (four-star general) and was appointed Vice Chairman of the Central Military Commission of the Workers' Party of Korea. This was seen as a sign of Kim's future as the next leader of the country. This was the first parade to allow full international press access, an unprecedented decision. Chief of the General Staff Ri Yong-ho gave the keynote speech. It displayed new surface-to-air missiles that resembled the S-300 and the HQ-9. The central chant of the parade was: "Kim Jong Il! Protect him to the death! Kim Jong Il, let's unite to support him!" It was the last time the Mercedes-Benz 600 was used in a military parade.

2015
The parade marked the 70th anniversary of the WPK. It was delayed for several hours due to thunderstorms that took place the night before. The parade did not feature any new weapons such as UAVs or ballistic missiles. Chinese First Secretary of the Secretariat of the Chinese Communist Party Liu Yunshan was in attendance. It also preceded the announcement of the 7th Congress of the Workers' Party of Korea. Among the parade formations was the Paektusan Hero Youth Shock Brigade, which came to Pyongyang at the personal request of Kim Jong Un.

2020
The 2020 parade marked the 75th anniversary of the foundation of the WPK. The parade was held in spite of the COVID-19 pandemic, with many foreign observers noticing the lack of facemasks in the parade and in the audience stands. The Kim Jong-un National Defense University participated in the parade for the first time. The school dean was put in charge of the school's preparation for the parade and a former soldier with "relevant experience" served as flag bearer for the KJU University colour. Renovations to the viewing platform om Kim Il Sung Square were made for the parade, with a new marble viewing platform replacing the previous one used for parades. Also, it was the first to be held at midnight, and saw the return of the Soviet style goose-step as the official parade step of all KPA formations. Additionally, Chinese military influences were also observed, such as the style of flag raising and turning of heads during parade inspection. Formations of military academy officers were dressed in a new redesigned full dress uniform that bore similarities to the Russian military uniform that was introduced in 2017. Generals, marshals and admirals wore new double-breasted dress uniforms based on those worn by Zhukov, Rokossovsky and other World War II Soviet marshals, generals and admirals at the Moscow Victory Parade of 1945. In addition new uniforms debuted which featured digital camouflage, replacing the classic combat uniforms that were used for many years. The massed military bands performed an exhibition drill routine, shaping the numbers "10.10", "1945", and "2020" during the prelude to the parade. In the mobile column, the most notable addition to the parade were four liquid-fueled ICBMs, unveiled for the first time since 2018. This parade also introduced a new main battle tank that had not previously been seen.

National Liberation Day/Victory Day
Parades in honor of the National Liberation Day of Korea and the Day of Victory in the Great Fatherland Liberation War:

1949 and 1953-60
The 1949 Liberation day parade was the first parade held since the DPRK's establishment. Held at Pyongyang Station, it celebrated the 4th liberation anniversary. A parade was held again in 1953 after the end of the Korean War, and then conducted every year until 1960. The 1960 parade celebrated the 15th anniversary of liberation. It was the last parade to be held until 1985.

1985
The parade was part of country's 40th anniversary of liberation ceremonies. In attendance was First Deputy Premier of the Soviet Union and future President of Azerbaijan Heydar Aliyev. The North Korean Koksan self-propelled gun was unveiled at the parade. Other notable attendees included O Chin-u, Kim Jong Il, and Marshal Vasily Petrov (Commander-in-Chief of the Soviet Army).

1993
This parade celebrated the ruby jubilee of the Korean armistice. It was the first one of its kind held in its honor and the only one held for 20 years.

2013

It celebrated the diamond jubilee since the armistice. It was attended by representatives of veterans groups from China and the DPRK, with Chinese Vice President Li Yuanchao attending on behalf of Xi Jinping. It was also attended by Chinese volunteers who fought on the side of the DPRK as part of People's Volunteer Army.

Outside of Vice President Li, attending dignitaries included the following:

Former PLA Air Force commander Yu Zhenwu
Mongolian Vice Minister of Defense Avirmed Battor
Deputy Commander of the Armed Forces of the Islamic Republic of Iran Sayed Hamidreza Tabatabaei
Vice President of Uganda Edward Ssekandi
Vice President of Zambia Guy Scott  
Assistant Secretary-General of the National Command of the Syrian Ba'ath Party Abdullah al-Ahmar
Deputy Chairman of the Russian Society of Veterans of the Korean War Janus Kanov

Politburo member U Tong-chuk appeared at the parade after a 17-month absence. Choe Ryong-hae, the director of the KPA General Political Bureau delivered the keynote address, saying that "a peaceful environment is important for the country that gives priority to economic construction and improvement of the lives of our people". American-made MD Helicopters MD 500 were unveiled during the parade.

Day of the Sun/Day of the Shining Star
Parades in honor of the Day of the Sun and the Day of the Shining Star:

April 2002
For the first time ever, the parade of 2002 marked the 90th anniversary of the birth of Kim Il-sung and this was the very first Day of the Sun parade ever to be organized in the 21st century. It was primarily a civil-military parade with the absence of the mobile column.

February 2012

2012 marked the 70th anniversary of the birth of Kim Jong Il. It was the first one of its nature held as the holiday was only elevated to the status of a national holiday following the death and state funeral of Kim Jong-il. It was the first parade during which Kim Jong Un attended in the position of Supreme Leader of North Korea, and was held at the forecourt of the Kumsusan Palace of the Sun.

April 2012
2012 marked the centenary of the birth of Kim Il-sung. On the Day of the Sun that year, current leader Kim Jong-un gave his first public speech. The KPA introduced the new KN-08 missile was in a parade. It also presented its UAVs for the first time during this parade. BBC reporter John Sudworth described the parade as one where "he could feel the ground shake as soldiers and rockets passed by". Markus Schiller, a weapons analyst, expressed his surprise with an ICBM's appearance, noting that most technology seen before were "one quarter of the size". Kim Jong-un's 20-minute address was his first speech since assuming the leadership. Officially published under the title of, Let Us March Forward Dynamically Towards Final Victory, Holding Higher the Banner of Songun, it was the basis of for the writing of the song, Onwards Toward the Final Victory.

2017
In 2017, the parade celebrated the 105th anniversary of the birth of the Kim Il Sung. During the parade, a new unit of Korean People's Army Special Operation Force wearing modern combat gear, including night-vision goggles and plate carriers, marched along with elements of the Korean People's Army in a parade on the 105th anniversary of the birth of the founder of North Korea Kim Il-sung in Pyongyang. Korean Central Television compared the new unit to the U.S. Navy SEALs and they described it with the name Lightning Commandos. The Pukkuksong-2 and the Hwasong-12 were unveiled at the parade. Delegations from socialist parties attended the festivities, including a delegation of the Party of Socialists of the Republic of Moldova led by MP Grigore Novac.

The columns of the troops are as follows:
Historical Troops
Soldiers in  uniform
Soldiers in constabulary force uniform
Soldiers in the Fatherland Liberation War period uniform

Guards and Various Branches from the Fatherland Liberation War
Guards Seoul 3rd Infantry Division
Guards Seoul Kim Chaek 4th Infantry Division
Guards Kang Kon 2nd Infantry Division
6th Infantry Division
Andong Choe Chun Guk 12th Infantry Division
Seoul Ryu Kyong Su Guards 105th Tank Division
Guards Lee Hoon 18th Infantry Regiment
Guards 2nd Marine Squadron
Guards 56th Destroyer Wing
Guards 10th Infantry Regiment
Guards 14th Infantry Regiment
Guards 86th Infantry Regiment
Guards 19th Anti-aircraft Artillery Regiment
Guards 23rd Anti-aircraft Artillery Brigade
Guards 1st Infantry Division
Guards 1st Air Division
Guards 60th Destroyer Wing

Corps-level Units
Navy
Air Force
Strategic Force
Special Operation Force
1st Corps
2nd Corps
4th Corps
5th Corps
91st Training Institute
3rd Corps
7th Corps
8th Corps
9th Corps
10th Corps
12th Corps
Anti-aircraft Artillery Corps
425th Training Institute
108th Training Institute
815th Training Institute
806th Training Institute

Infantry Divisions
46th Infantry Division
9th Infantry Division
25th Infantry Division
13th Infantry Division
15th Infantry Division
5th Infantry Division

Universities and Military Schools at all levels
Kim Il Sung Military University
Kim Il Sung University of Politics
Kim Jong Suk Naval University
Kim Chaek Air Force University
O Jung Hup Defence University
Rim Chun Chu Military University of Medical Sciences
Kim Il Sung Military University Female Cadre Training Center
Kang Kon Military Academy
O Jin U Artillery Academy
Chaehyun Military Academy
Tank-Automobile Military Academy
Signal Corps Military Academy
Anti-aircraft Artillery Academy
Defense Comprehensive Military Academy
Kim Jong Il University of People's Security
Mangyongdae Revolutionary School
Kang Pan Sok Revolutionary school
Nampo Revolutionary School

Worker-Peasant Red Guards branches
Pyongyang City Branch
South Pyongan Province Branch
North Pyongan Province Branch
South Hamgyong Province Branch
North Hamgyong Province Branch
South Hwanghae Province Branch
North Hwanghae Province Branch
Ryanggang Province Branch
Chagang Province Branch
Kangwon Province Branch
Nampo City Branch
Kim Il Sung University Branch
Kim Chaek University of Technology Branch
Pyongyang Medical University Female Branch
Pyongyang University of Architecture Branch
Han Tok Su University Of Light Industry Branch

2022 
Day of the Sun festivties in 2022 featured a civilian only parade in Kim Il-Sung Square, the first civilian only parade in the holiday's history.

Other parades

June 1972
A special parade was held outside of Pyongyang for the first time on 6 June 1972 in the northeastern border city of Hyesan, Ryanggang Province. The parade was attended by President Kim Il Sung and was officiated by the party secretary for the province. Yi Yong-mu, a member of the Central Committee and later Director General of the General Political Bureau delivered a speech at the parade on Hyesan Square.

May 2016 
A civil parade was held after the 7th Congress of the Workers' Party of Korea on 10 May 2016.

January 2021 
A parade was held after the 8th Congress of the Workers' Party of Korea on 16 January 2021. It began at around six in the evening lasting over 2 hours. General Kim Jong-gwan was the keynote speaker at the parade, with Marshal Ri Pyong-chol (the Vice Chairman of the Central Military Commission of the Workers' Party of Korea) serving as parade inspector. The headliner of the parade was a new submarine-launched ballistic missile known as the Pukguksong-5ㅅ, which KCNA declared was the "world's most powerful weapon." However, no ICBMs were displayed. The column of planes depicted number "8" with fireworks in the sky.

The columns of the troops are as follows:
Honor calvarymen
Guard Office of the Party Central Committee
Guard Department of the State Affairs Commission
Guard Department of the Party Central Committee
Guard Command
First Corps
Second Corps
Forth Corps
Fifth Corps
Navy
Air Force
Strategic Force
Ground Snipers of the Special Operation Force
Sea Snipers of the Special Operation Force
Air Snipers of the Special Operation Force
Lightly-armed Infantrymen
Anti-aircraft Artillerymen
91st Corps
3rd Corps
7th Corps
8th Corps
9th Corps
10th Corps
12th Corps
Tank Units and Armored Infantry Divisions
Seoul Ryu Kyong Su Guards 105th Tank Division
425th Mechanized Infantry Division
108th Mechanized Infantry Division
815th Mechanized Infantry Division
806th Mechanized Infantry Division
Mountain Warfare Infantrymen
Reconnoiters
Electronic Harassment Unit
Engineer Unit
Chemical Warfare Unit
Armed Mobile Unit for Public Security

The following day, the Joint Chiefs of Staff of South Korea detected signs of the parade in central Pyongyang, which resulted in a statement by Kim Yo-jong condemning South Korea, describing it as "weird" for the South Koreans made a "senseless statement that they captured the north opening a military parade at midnight on Jan. 10". A couple of days later, another government statement was released criticizing the statement by Japanese Defence Minister Nobuo Kishi, who said that Japan is analyzing information linked to weapons unveiled at the parade. On 17 January, General Secretary Kim Jong Un had a photo session with the participants in the military parade.

See also
Chinese National Day Parade
Mongolian State Flag Day
Victory Day Parades

References

External links

 North Korea Military Parade October 10, 1995 (AP Clip)
 North Korea Military Parade April 25, 1992 (KCTV Live)
 North Korea Parade Preparations Caught on Satellite | NYT
 North Korea 2013 Military & Civilian Parade — Full Version
NORTH KOREA PARADE
North Korea Military Parade September 9, 1998 (KCTV Live)
North Korean Military Parade (75 Year Anniversary)
North Korea Military Parade February 8, 2018
North Korea Orchestrates Huge Military Parade
Lavish military parade in Pyongyang marks 60th anniversary of Korean War armistice
North Korea 2013 Parade - KPA 81st Anniversary

Military parades
Events in Pyongyang